Rishad Premji is the son of the Wipro head Azim Premji and was named as the successor of his father. He was until recently the Chief Strategy Officer at Wipro and took over as Chairman of Wipro in July 2019. He was the Chairman of NASSCOM for the year 2018–19.

Early and personal life 
Rishad was a student of Cathedral and John Connon School in Mumbai and later did a bachelor's degree in Economics from Wesleyan University and his MBA from Harvard Business School.
In 2005, he married his childhood friend Aditi. They have two children. Rishad enjoys travelling and movies and is a huge cricket fan.

Career 
After his MBA, Rishad worked with Bain and Co. for two years and then for four years with GE Capital in USA.

In 2007, he joined his father's company Wipro as a business manager.

Awards and recognition 
In 2014, Rishad was recognised as a Young Global Leader by the World Economic Forum for his outstanding professional accomplishments, leadership and commitment to society.

References

Wipro
Living people
Wesleyan University alumni
Harvard Business School alumni
1977 births
21st-century Indian businesspeople
Indian Ismailis
Khoja Ismailism